Lieutenant-Colonel William Campbell (died 1796), was an officer of the 24th Regiment of Foot of the British Army and a briefly-serving Governor of Bermuda.

Campbell, then a Major, had been the commander of the British fort built in 1794 on the Miami Rapids, and had refused to engage with American troops before the advance of Major-General Anthony Wayne's Legion of the United States during the Northwest Indian War. Having been appointed Governor of Bermuda, Campbell arrived at Bermuda on the 22 November 1796, but died on the 2 December and was buried at St. Peter's Church.

References

Governors of Bermuda
People of the Northwest Indian War
18th-century British Army personnel
South Wales Borderers officers
1796 deaths

Year of birth missing